The Șoala is a right tributary of the river Vișa in Romania. It flows into the Vișa in Agârbiciu.

References

Rivers of Romania
Rivers of Sibiu County